Battle of Vosges or Battle of the Vosges may refer to any of the following battles:
 Battle of Vosges (58 BC)
 Battle of Trippstadt, 1794 battle that occurred in the lower Vosges Mountains
 Battle of the Vosges, 1914 battle of the First World War
 Battle of the Lost Battalion, events of October 1944